Pteris tripartita is a species of fern native to Africa, Indonesia, and the Marquesas.

References

tripartita
Taxa named by Olof Swartz